Peter Hunter may refer to:
 Peter Hunter (British Army officer), British Army officer and colonial administrator
 Peter Hay Hunter, minister of the Church of Scotland and author
 Peter Hunter (bioengineer), recipient of the Rutherford Medal (Royal Society of New Zealand)

See also
 Pete Hunter, American football defensive back